Events from the year 1829 in Canada.

Incumbents
Monarch: George IV

Federal government
Parliament of Lower Canada: 13th 
Parliament of Upper Canada: 10th

Governors
Governor of the Canadas: James Kempt
Governor of New Brunswick: Howard Douglas
Governor of Nova Scotia: Thomas Nickleson Jeffery
Civil Governor of Newfoundland: Thomas John Cochrane
Governor of Prince Edward Island: John Ready

Events
January 4 – Sir John Colbe, Lieutenant Governor of Upper Canada founds Upper Canada College, as a feeder school to the newly formed University of Toronto and a home for the colony's upper class.
November 30 – construction of the first Welland Canal is completed.

Births
May 28 – A. B. Rogers, surveyor (died 1889)
June 7 – Joseph Godéric Blanchet, politician (died 1890)
July 10 – Louis-Adélard Senécal, businessman and politician (died 1887)
August 1 – John James Fraser, lawyer, judge, politician and 4th Premier of New Brunswick (died 1896)
December 5 – Henri-Gustave Joly de Lotbinière, politician, Minister, 4th Premier of Quebec and Lieutenant Governor of British Columbia (died 1908)

Deaths
June 6 – Shanawdithit, last recorded surviving member of the Beothuk people of Newfoundland (b. c1801)

References 

 
Canada
Years of the 19th century in Canada
1829 in North America